Group B of UEFA Euro 1996 was one of four groups in the final tournament's initial group stage. It began on 9 June and was completed on 18 June. The group consisted of France, Spain, Bulgaria and Romania.

France won the group and advanced to the quarter-finals, along with Spain. Bulgaria and Romania failed to advance.

On the second matchday, on 13 June, the match between Bulgaria and Romania featured a ghost goal by Dorinel Munteanu. In the first half, with Romania already 1–0 down to an early Hristo Stoichkov goal, Munteanu's shot hit the crossbar, crossed the goal line by about a foot, after which it bounced back. Referee Peter Mikkelsen and his assistants did not notice and the goal was not awarded.

Teams

Standings

In the quarter-finals,
The winner of Group B, France, advanced to play the runner-up of Group A, Netherlands.
The runner-up of Group B, Spain, advanced to play the winner of Group A, England.

Matches

Spain vs Bulgaria

Romania vs France

Bulgaria vs Romania

France vs Spain

France vs Bulgaria

Romania vs Spain

Notes

References

External links
UEFA Euro 1996 Group B

Group B
Group
Group
Romania at UEFA Euro 1996
Bulgaria at UEFA Euro 1996